Flag Officer Submarines (FOSM) may refer to:
 Flag Officer Submarines (India)
 Commodore Submarine Service, earlier called Flag Officer Submarines.